Pakistan competed at the 1972 Summer Olympics in Munich, West Germany. The men's hockey team won a silver medal.

Medalists
Silver medal in men's field hockey team competition

Results by event

Athletics
Men's 200 metres
Nusrat Iqbal Sahi
 Heat 6 1st round; 22.07 (→ did not advance)

Men's 400 metres
Nusrat Iqbal Sahi
 Heat 1 1st round; 49.47 (→ did not advance)

Men's 800 metres
Muhammad Siddique
 Heat 6 1st round; 1:52.6 (→ did not advance)

Men's 1500 metres
Mohammad Younus
 Heat 2 1st round; 3:44.1 (→ did not advance)

Men's 110 metres hurdles
Bashir Ahmed
 Heat 1 1st round; 15.38 (→ did not advance)

Men's 400 metres hurdles
Norman Brinkworth
 Heat 3 1st round; 54.67 (→ did not advance)

Men's 4 × 100 m relay
Mohammad Younus, Norman Brinkworth, Muhammad Siddique and Nusrat Iqbal Sahi 
 Heat 1 1st round; DNP (→ did not participate)

Boxing
Men's Flyweight (– 51 kg)
 Jan Baloch
 First round — Lost to Georgi Kostadinov (BUL), TKO-2

Men's Light Welterweight (– 63.5 kg)
Malang Baloch
 First round — Lost to Graham Moughton (GBR), 0:5

Hockey

Men's Team Competition
Preliminary round Group A
 Defeated  (3-0)
 Defeated  (3-1)
 Defeated  (3-1)
 Defeated  (3-0)
 Defeated  (3-1)
Semifinals
 Defeated  (2-0)
Final

Team Roster
 Mohammad Asad Malik (captain)
 Saeed Anwar (vice-captain)
 Saleem Sherwani (gk)
 Mohammad Aslam (gk)
 Munawwaruz Zaman
 Zahid Sheikh
 Fazalur Rehman
 Shahnaz Sheikh
 Abdul Rasheed Jr
 Akhtarul Islam
 Islahuddin
 Mudassar Asghar
 Jahangir Butt
 Iftikhar Syed
 Riaz Ahmed
 Akhtar Rasool
 Tanvir Dar
 Umar Farooq

Weightlifting

Men's Middleweight (-75 kg)

Mohammad Arshad Malik

 Press 117.5kg
 Snatch 107.5kg
 Jerk 147.5kg
 Total 372.5kg (finished 19th out of 19)

Wrestling
Men's Freestyle Bantamweight (– 67 kg)
Allah Ditta
 1st round — Lost to Jorge Ramos (CUB)
 2nd round — Lost to Risto Darlev (YUG)

Men's Freestyle Welterweight (– 74 kg)
Muhammad Yaghoub
 1st round — Lost to Mildos Urbanovics (HUN)
 2nd round — Drew with Shakar Khan Shakar (AFG)
 3rd round — Lost to Jan Karlsson (SWE)

References
Official Olympic Reports
International Olympic Committee results database

Nations at the 1972 Summer Olympics
1972 Summer Olympics
1972 in Pakistani sport